The Ghrmaghele is a station on the Akhmeteli–Varketili Line (First Line) of the Tbilisi Metro. It opened on 28 November 1985. It serves the neighbourhood it is named after. In the hall of the station, there are high-relief images created in honor of the metro builders.

References

External links
 Ghrmaghele station page at Tbilisi Municipal Portal

Tbilisi Metro stations
Railway stations opened in 1985
1985 establishments in Georgia (country)